Forstera bellidifolia, the Tasmanian forstera, is a species in the family Stylidiaceae that is endemic to Tasmania, Australia. It was described by William Jackson Hooker in an 1851 volume of Icones Plantarum. It is notably different from other members of the genus in that it is not native to New Zealand nor does it possess the epigynous nectaries that are present in the other species.

Forstera bellidifolia is a glabrous perennial plant with oblong-spathulate leaves arranged in a basal rosette. Forstera bellidifolia is endemic to Tasmania and is widespread but primarily located in the mountainous regions of Western and Southwestern Tasmania in the Tasmanian Central Highlands, Tasmanian Northern Slopes, and Tasmanian West biogeographical regions.

References 

bellidifolia
Plants described in 1851
Flora of Tasmania